Lars Detlef Kleppich (born 9 August 1967 in Sydney, New South Wales) is a former windsurfer from Australia, who competed in three Summer Olympics for his native country, starting in 1992. He won the bronze medal in the Men's Lechner Sailboard Class in Barcelona, Spain (1992). He was an Australian Institute of Sport scholarship holder.

References

External links
 
 
 
 

1967 births
Living people
Australian windsurfers
Australian male sailors (sport)
Olympic sailors of Australia
Olympic bronze medalists for Australia
Olympic medalists in sailing
Sailors at the 1992 Summer Olympics – Lechner A-390
Sailors at the 2000 Summer Olympics – Mistral One Design
Sailors at the 2004 Summer Olympics – Mistral One Design
Medalists at the 1992 Summer Olympics
Sportspeople from Sydney
Australian Institute of Sport sailors
20th-century Australian people